Split personality is a popular term used to refer to the mental illness dissociative identity disorder, which was previously known as multiple personality disorder. 

Split personality may also refer to:
 Split Personalities (album), a 1998 album by 12 Rods
 Split Personality (Cassidy album), a 2004 rap album released by Cassidy
 Split Personality (All-4-One album), a 2004 album released by the R&B group All-4-One
 Split Personality (Mila J album), a 2006 album by American R&B/hip hop singer Mila J
 "Split Personality" (song), a 1986 song by the hip-hop group UTFO
 Split Personality (game show), a 1967 Australian television series
 Split Personality, a 1959 American game show hosted by Tom Poston.
 Split Personalities (video game), a 1986 puzzle-based video game
 "Split Personality", a song by Pink from her 2000 debut album Can't Take Me Home
 "Split Personality", an episode of season 2 of Phineas and Ferb